Buttertubs Marsh is a bird sanctuary in Nanaimo, British Columbia, Canada. 

Located in the middle of the city of Nanaimo, the marsh covers approximately 100 acres (40 hectares). Within this is the 46 acre (18.7 hectare) Buttertubs Marsh Conservation Area, owned by the Nature Trust of British Columbia.

The marsh is man-made and is home to great blue herons, mallards, Canada geese, ring-necked ducks, hooded mergansers, American wigeons, violet-green swallows and red-winged blackbirds. 

The sanctuary is Vancouver Island's only documented breeding site of American bittern.

Approximately half of the wetland area is privately owned, and efforts are underway to purchase the remaining land to protect it against development. Some residential development has already taken place on the eastern edge of the site.

References

Nanaimo
Bird sanctuaries of Canada
Important Bird Areas of British Columbia